Post Office Act (with their variations) is a stock short title initially used in the United Kingdom and later in the United States and other English speaking countries, for legislation relating to the post office.

List

Bahamas
Post Office Act 1914

Bermuda
Post Office Act 1900

Canada
Post Office Act 1867

India
 Indian Post Office Act 1898 
 Indian Post Office (Amendment) Bill, 2002

Ireland
 Post Office Act, 1908, Adaptation Order, 1932 
 Post Office (Amendment) Act 1951 
 Post Office (Amendment) Act 1969

Isle of Man
Isle of Man Post Office Authority Act 1972
Isle of Man Post Office Authority (Postal Services Etc.) Act 1973
Post Office Act 1993

Jamaica
 Post Office Act 1941

Malaysia
Post Office Act 1947
Post Office Savings Bank Act 1948

South Africa
Post Office Act 1958 
Post Office Amendment Act, 1991 
South African Post Office Act 2011

United Kingdom
An Act for Erecting and Establishing a Post Office, 1660 (Charles II) 
The Post Office (Revenues) Act 1710 (9 Ann c 11)
The New General Post Office, Edinburgh, Act 1858 (21 & 22 Vict c 40)
The South-western (of London) District Post Office Act 1880 (43 & 44 Vict c xciv)
The Post Office and Telegraph Act 1897 (60 & 61 Vict c 41)
The Post Office (Guarantee) Act 1898 (61 & 62 Vict c 18)
The Post Office Guarantee (No. 2) Act 1898 (61 & 62 Vict c 59)
The Post Office (Money Orders) Act 1903 (3 Edw 7 c 12)
The Post Office Act 1904 (4 Edw 7 c 14)
The Post Office (Money Orders) Act 1906 (6 Edw 7 c 4)
The Post Office (Literature for the Blind) Act 1906 (6 Edw 7 c 22)
The Post Office Act 1908 (8 Edw 7 c 48)
The Post Office Act 1913 (3 & 4 Geo 5 c 11)
The Post Office and Telegraph Act 1920 (10 & 11 Geo 5 c 40)
The Post Office (Pneumatic Tubes Acquisition) Act 1922 (12 & 13 Geo 5 c 43)
The Post Office (Parcels) Act 1922 (12 & 13 Geo 5 c 49)
The Post Office (Amendment) Act 1935 (25 & 26 Geo 5 c 15)
The Post Office (Amendment) Act 1952 (15 & 16 Geo 6 & 1 Eliz 2 c 36)
The Post Office Act 1953 (1 & 2 Eliz 2 c 36)
The Post Office Savings Bank Act 1954 (2 & 3 Eliz 2 c 62)
The Post Office Act 1961 (9 & 10 Eliz 2 c 15)
The Post Office Savings Bank Act 1966 (c 12)
The Post Office (Borrowing Powers) Act 1967 (c 15)
The Post Office (Data Processing Service) Act 1967 (c 62)
The Post Office Act 1969 (c 48)
The Post Office (Banking Services) Act 1976 (c 10)
The Postal Services Act 2000
The Postal Services Act 2011 

The Post Office Acts 1837 to 1895 was the collective title of the following Acts:
The Post Office (Repeal of Laws) Act 1837 (7 Will 4 & 1 Vict c 32)
The Post Office Management Act 1837 (7 Will 4 & 1 Vict c 33)
The Post Office (Offences) Act 1837 (7 Will 4 & 1 Vict c 36)
The Post Office (Duties) Act 1840 (3 & 4 vict c 96)
The Post Office (Duties) Act 1844 (7 & 8 Vict c 49)
The Post Office (Duties) Act 1847 (10 & 11 Vict c 85)
The Post Office (Money Orders) Act 1848 (11 & 12 Vict c 88)
The Colonial Inland Post Office Act 1849 (12 & 13 Vict c 66)
The Post Office (Duties) Act 1860 (23 & 24 Vict c 65)
The Post Office Lands Act 1863 (26 & 27 Vict c 43)
The Post Office (Postmaster-General) Act 1866 (29 & 30 Vict c 55)
The Telegraph Act 1868 (31 & 32 Vict c 110)
The Telegraph Act 1869 (32 & 33 Vict c 73)
The Post Office Act 1870 (33 & 34 Vict c 79)
The Post Office Act 1875 (38 & 39 Vict c 22)
The Post Office (Money Orders) Act 1880 (43 & 44 Vict c 33)
The Post Office Newspaper Act 1881 (44 & 45 Vict c 19)
The Post Office (Land) Act 1881 (44 & 45 Vict c 20)
The Post Office (Reply Post Cards) Act 1882 (45 & 46 Vict c 2)
The Post Office (Parcels) Act 1882 (45 & 46 Vict c 74)
The Post Office (Money Orders) Act 1883 (46 & 47 Vict c 58)
The Post Office (Protection) Act 1884 (47 & 48 Vict c 76)
The Telegraph Act 1885 (48 & 49 Vict c 58)
The Telegraph (Isle of Man) Act 1889 (52 & 53 Vict c 34)
The Post Office Act 1891 (54 & 55 Vict c 46)
The Post Office Act 1892 (55 & 56 Vict c 24)
The Post Office Amendment Act 1895 (58 & 59 Vict c 18)

The Post Office (Duties) Acts 1840 to 1891 is the collective title of the following Acts:
The Post Office (Duties) Act 1840 (3 & 4 vict c 96)
The Post Office (Duties) Act 1844 (7 & 8 Vict c 49)
The Post Office (Duties) Act 1847 (10 & 11 Vict c 85)
The Post Office (Reply Post Cards) Act 1882 (45 & 46 Vict c 2)
The Post Office Act 1891 (54 & 55 Vict c 46)
The Post Office (Duties) Act 1860 (23 & 24 Vict c 65)
The Post Office Act 1870 (33 & 34 Vict c 79)
The Post Office Act 1875 (38 & 39 Vict c 22)

The Post Office (Management) Acts 1837 to 1884 was the collective title of the following Acts:
The Post Office Management Act 1837 (7 Will 4 & 1 Vict c 33)
The Post Office (Offences) Act 1837 (7 Will 4 & 1 Vict c 36)
The Colonial Inland Post Office Act 1849 (12 & 13 Vict c 66)
The Post Office Lands Act 1863 (26 & 27 Vict c 43)
The Post Office (Land) Act 1881 (44 & 45 Vict c 20)
The Post Office (Protection) Act 1884 (47 & 48 Vict c 76)

The Post Office (Money Orders) Acts 1848 to 1883 is the collective title of the following Acts:
The Post Office (Money Orders) Act 1848 (11 & 12 Vict c 88)
The Post Office (Money Orders) Act 1880 (43 & 44 Vict c 33)
The Post Office (Money Orders) Act 1883 (46 & 47 Vict c 58)

The Post Office (Offences) Acts 1837 to 1884 is the collective title of the following Acts:
The Post Office (Offences) Act 1837 (7 Will 4 & 1 Vict c 36)
The Post Office (Protection) Act 1884 (47 & 48 Vict c 76)

The Post Office Savings Bank Acts 1861 to 1893 is the collective title of the following Acts:
The Post Office Savings Bank Act 1861 (24 & 25 Vict c 14)
And the enactments applied by that Act which are for the time being in force
The Post Office Savings Bank Act 1863 (26 & 27 Vict c 14)
The Post Office Savings Bank Act 1874 (37 & 38 Vict c 73)
The Savings Banks Act 1880 (43 & 44 Vict c 36), so far as it relates to Post Office Savings Banks
Parts I and III of the Savings Banks Act 1887 (50 & 51 Vict c 40)
So much of the Savings Banks Act 1891 (54 & 55 Vict c 21), as relates to the Post Office Savings Bank
The Savings Banks Act 1893 (56 & 57 Vict c 69)

United States
Postal Service Act of 1792
Post Office Act of 1872
Comstock Act of 1873
Postal Reorganization Act of 1970

See also
List of short titles

References

Lists of legislation by short title and collective title